RaceRoom Racing Experience is a free-to-play racing simulator for Microsoft Windows, developed by Sector3 Studios, (formerly known as SimBin Studios) and published by RaceRoom Entertainment AG. Their aim is to provide an authentic racing experience through detailed car and track models as well as realistic car behaviour and sounds. The game provides a selection of free-to-play race cars and tracks to drive in multiplayer and single player games modes. Sponsored competitions and other free-to-play events allow users to use premium game content at no cost.

Gameplay
RaceRoom offers many different game modes such as Multiplayer Races, Custom Championships, Single Races against AI, Practice, Leaderboard Challenges and Online Competitions. The simulation also includes an online portal that keeps track of player statistics and leaderboard entries that serve as a platform for the players' activities.

The sim also support Virtual Reality through Valve Index, HTC Vive, Oculus Rift or Windows Mixed Reality.

Development
According to Sector3's Christopher Speed, RaceRoom is created and maintained by 10-11 people. Since its release on February 12, 2013, RaceRoom has been updated regularly with new features and content and has received significant improvements in all departments.

RaceRoom is built utilising Image Space Incorporated's isiMotor2 racing simulation game engine. Unlike prior SimBin & Sector3 Studio releases, RaceRoom uses its own proprietary RendR graphics engine which is capable of different times of day, features commonly used post-processing effects and has native support for rain (rain is not featured in Raceroom though). RaceRoom also features a custom audio engine and is often cited as the benchmark sounding racing simulation on PC. In a March 2016 interview with Inside Sim Racing, Sector 3's Jean-François Chardon stated the original ISI code remaining in RaceRoom is "less than 20 percent".

In March 2016 Christopher Speed posted a thread on the official Sector3 Studios forums titled 'In response to the so-called 'leak'... that a 'very small team investigating and evaluating newer technologies for the future'. Christopher Speed included an in-game screenshot of R3E running on Unreal Engine of a BMW Z4 GT3 at the Circuit de Spa-Francorchamps. In a February 2017 interview with racing simulation website Race Department, Christopher Speed announced RaceRoom would be replacing the RendR graphics engine with Unreal Engine 4 with RaceRoom's conversion to Unreal Engine 4 to be aided by a partnership with SimBin Studios UK who are utilising Unreal Engine 4 for GTR 3.

Sector3 Studios works with real racecar drivers, using feedback from Bruno Spengler, Daniel Juncadella, Kelvin van der Linde, and Mikaela Åhlin-Kottulinsky to fettle the simulation aspects of R3E such as vehicle physics and tyre modelling. Telemetry data derived from global partners such as DTM, WTCC, ADAC GT Masters and KW Suspensions is also used to further develop the physics model of the cars.

The sim was used by the World Touring Car Cup for their 2020 Esports series due to the season being postponed because of the COVID-19 pandemic.

Vehicles
There are 252 fully licensed cars available from 46 manufacturers, spanning from touring cars, GT cars, prototypes, GTO, open wheel, 4th generation Group 5 cars, sportcars, hillclimb and historic classes.

In March 2022, it was announced that RaceRoom would be adding a new car pack, to emulate the 2021 DTM Championship.  New car models introduced with the pack include the Ferrari 488 GT3 EVO 2020 and the McLaren 720S GT3

Tracks
The R3E track roster includes 60 tracks from all across the globe, including the entire DTM and ADAC GT Masters calendar, hillclimb tracks and a laser-scanned Nürburgring-Nordschleife. The total number of track layouts is 129.

Reception
Eurogamer reviewed RaceRoom in 2014 and called it "the best racing game you've never heard of".

See also
 Sim racing
 List of simulation video games
 List of driving and racing video games

References

External links
 

2013 video games
Free-to-play video games
Racing simulators
Video games developed in Sweden
Windows games
Windows-only games